This list of botanical gardens and arboretums in Ohio is intended to include all significant botanical gardens and arboretums in the U.S. state of Ohio.

See also
List of botanical gardens and arboretums in the United States

References 

 
 
Tourist attractions in Ohio
botanical gardens and arboretums in Ohio